Carry On Up the Charts: The Best of the Beautiful South is an album by English Alternative rock band The Beautiful South. It is the group's fifth album and their first greatest hits collection. It was a major commercial success, reaching number one in the UK Albums Chart and going on to become the second biggest selling album of 1994.

Release
Carry On Up the Charts was released in November 1994, the same year as the band's previous album Miaow, with its only single, "One Last Love Song", being released in October 1994, only two months after "Prettiest Eyes"; the last single to be taken from Miaow. "One Last Love Song" reached number 14 in the UK Singles Chart.

The album includes all of the single releases from the band's first five years in order of their release. Its title is a reference to the Carry On film series. A two-disc Limited Edition version was also released, with the bonus disc containing Non-LP/CD B-sides from the singles.

Chart performance
Released at a time when the group's album sales had been waning, it proved to be a surprise success. The album reached no. 1 on the UK Albums Chart on 3 December 1994 and went on to become the second biggest selling album of 1994. By the summer of 1995 it was certified as 5× platinum in the UK. Such was the album's popularity, it was claimed that one in seven British households owned a copy.

Track listing

Initial copies of the double-CD pack had a 1994 BBC Radio 1 session version of "Let Love Speak Up Itself" with Jacqueline Abbott on vocals instead of the single version fronted by Paul Heaton.
Copies of the Canadian release also include the album tracks "I Think the Answer's Yes" and "I'm Your No.1 Fan".
The US, German and Japanese releases also include a cover of "Dream a Little Dream" (music by Fabian Andre & Wilbur Schwandt, lyric by Gus Kahn).
The Japanese release also includes "Les Yeux Ouverts" (music by Fabian Andre & Wilbur Schwandt, French lyric by Brice Homs & Kurin Ternovizeff). Both it and "Dream a Little Dream" were recorded for the movie French Kiss. It was re-used in the film  The Devil Wears Prada.

Limited edition bonus disc
The limited edition bonus disc contains non-LP/CD B-sides from their single releases.

Copies of the Canadian release also include "Fleet St. BC" (from "Old Red Eyes Is Back") and "Mr. Obsession" (from "One Last Love Song").

CD single/CDEP B-sides
As was their usual modus operandi, the Beautiful South included unreleased material on the B-sides of the singles taken from their albums. One new single was released for this compilation. Details of CD singles for the other 13 tracks can be found under the entries for their original studio albums.

from the "One Last Love Song" CD1
"One Last Love Song"
"Right Man for the Job"
"Java"

from the "One Last Love Song" CD2
"One Last Love Song" 
"Mr Obsession"
"You're Only Jealous"

Personnel
Paul Heaton – vocals
Dave Hemingway – vocals
Briana Corrigan – vocals (tracks 1–10)
Jacqui Abbott – vocals (tracks 11–14)
Dave Rotheray – guitar
Sean Welch – bass
Dave Stead – drums

Charts

Certifications and sales

References

External links
 

The Beautiful South albums
Albums produced by Jon Kelly
B-side compilation albums
1994 greatest hits albums
Go! Discs compilation albums
Jangle pop compilation albums
1994 in British music